Watch Me Fall is the second and final solo studio album by Jay Reatard. It was released on August 4, 2009 by Matador Records.

Reception

Initial critical response to Watch Me Fall was positive. At Metacritic, which assigns a normalized rating out of 100 to reviews from mainstream critics, the album has received an average score of 76 based on 23 reviews.

The album briefly entered the U.S. Billboard 200, peaking at 182.

Track listing

Musicians 

 Jay Reatard - Vocals and all instruments, except:
 Billy Hayes - drums on tracks 6, 7, 8, 11
 Jonathan Kirkscey - cello on tracks 11, 12

References

External links
 

2009 albums
Jay Reatard albums
Matador Records albums